Zaeeroides is a genus of longhorn beetles of the subfamily Lamiinae, containing the following species:

 Zaeeroides florensis Breuning, 1959
 Zaeeroides luzonica Breuning, 1938

References

Pteropliini